Mauidrillia supralaevis is an extinct species of sea snail, a marine gastropod mollusk in the family Horaiclavidae.

Description

Distribution
This extinct marine species is endemic to New Zealand and was found in Miocene strata of South Island.

References

 Powell, A.W.B. 1942: The New Zealand Recent and fossil Mollusca of the family Turridae. Bulletin of the Auckland Institute and Museum 2: 188 p
 P. A. Maxwell. 1988. Late Miocene Deep-Water Mollusca from the Stillwater Mudstone at Greymouth, Westland, New Zealand: Paleoecology and Systematics. New Zealand Geological Survey Paleontological Bulletin 55
 Maxwell, P.A. (2009). Cenozoic Mollusca. pp. 232–254 in Gordon, D.P. (ed.) New Zealand inventory of biodiversity. Volume one. Kingdom Animalia: Radiata, Lophotrochozoa, Deuterostomia. Canterbury University Press, Christchurch

External links

supralaevis
Gastropods described in 1942